Kietlin  is a village in the administrative district of Gmina Niemcza, within Dzierżoniów County, Lower Silesian Voivodeship, in south-western Poland.

Kietlin Palace (German: Schloß Kittelau) is situated in the village.

The village has a population of 250.

References

Villages in Dzierżoniów County